The 2022 WK League was the 14th season of the WK League, the top division of women's football in South Korea. The regular season ran from 2 April to 27 October 2022, and the play-offs from 4 to 26 November 2022.

The total number of rounds has been reduced from 28 to 21 due to the 2022 FIFA U-20 Women's World Cup and the 2022 Asian Games.

Teams

Foreign players
The total number of foreign players was restricted to three per club, including a slot for a player from the Asian Football Confederation countries. Boeun Sangmu were not allowed to sign any foreign players due to their military status.

League table

Results

Matches 1 to 14

Matches 15 to 21

Play-offs
The semi-final was played as a single-elimination match, and the Championship Final over two legs.

Semi-final

Championship final
First leg

Second leg

Incheon Hyundai Steel Red Angels won 2–0 on aggregate.

References

External links
WK League official website 

2022
Women
South Korea